Line Bjørnsen (born 3 July 1992) is a Norwegian handball player for København Håndbold.  

She is a younger sister of international handballer Kristian Bjørnsen.

She also represented Norway in the 2011 Women's Junior European Handball Championship, placing 12th, and in the 2012 Women's Junior World Handball Championship, placing 8th.

Achievements
Norwegian League:
Bronze Medalist: 2015/2016
Norwegian Cup:
Silver Medalist: 2016
World Youth Championship:
Silver Medalist: 2010

Individual awards
 All-Star Right Wing of Grundigligaen: 2016/2017

References
 

Norwegian female handball players
1992 births
Living people  
Expatriate handball players
Norwegian expatriate sportspeople in Denmark
Sportspeople from Stavanger